Dionisio Damian Cabrera Hornos (born 17 November 1986) is a Uruguayan footballer who plays for Arões as a midfielder.

Notes

References

1986 births
Living people
Uruguayan footballers
Association football midfielders
Uruguayan Primera División players
Liga I players
Club Plaza Colonia de Deportes players
SD Compostela footballers
FC Vaslui players
Moreirense F.C. players
Varzim S.C. players
Clube Caçadores das Taipas players
CD El Ejido players
CD Calahorra players
Uruguayan expatriate footballers
Expatriate footballers in Romania 
Uruguayan expatriate sportspeople in Romania
Expatriate footballers in Portugal
Uruguayan expatriate sportspeople in Portugal
Expatriate footballers in Spain
Uruguayan expatriate sportspeople in Spain
Footballers from Montevideo